The Columbus Pride is a professional women's ultimate team based in Columbus, Ohio which competes in the Premier Ultimate League (PUL). The team joined the PUL for the league's inaugural 2019 season. Their stated mission is to "increase the visibility of elite female ultimate players in Columbus and surrounding areas, provide role models to young athletes, and compete at a high, spirited level."

Franchise history 
The Pride formed in early 2019, and is one of the original eight teams in the Premier Ultimate League.  

The team would have played its second season in 2020 and held tryouts in early 2020, but the PUL cancelled the season due to the COVID-19 pandemic.

In 2021, the Pride competed at the Midwest weekend of the PUL's abbreviated competition season, placing second. They fell in overtime to the Milwaukee Monarchs and defeated the Indianapolis Red.

Record 
Going into the 2019 season, Ultiworld's power rankings placed the Pride at 6th in the league. In their 2019 regular season, the Pride defeated the Nashville Nightshade 24-13 and the Indianapolis Red 15–12. They fell to the NY Gridlock 10–17, the Medellin Revolution 16–18, and the Raleigh Radiance 13–20. This record gave them a sixth-place finish in the league, which did not qualify them for the playoffs.

In 2021, the Pride lost to the Milwaukee Monarchs 11-12 and defeated the Indianapolis Red 21-7.

The Pride will compete in the PUL's 2022 season, which runs from April through June 2022.

Current coaching staff 

 Head coach: Joseph Marmerstein
 Assistant coach: Alaine Wetli
 Founder: Mary Turner
 Founder: Sadie Jezierski
 Founder: Corinn "Champ" Pruitt

Roster
The team's 2020 roster was as follows:

References

External links 
Official website: https://www.nygridlockultimate.com/

Premier Ultimate League teams
Ultimate (sport) teams
Ultimate teams established in 2019
2019 establishments in Ohio
Sports teams in Columbus, Ohio